Bruno St. Jacques (born August 22, 1980) is a former Canadian professional ice hockey defenceman who played in the National Hockey League (NHL). He played in 67 games over parts of four NHL seasons with the Philadelphia Flyers, Carolina Hurricanes, and Mighty Ducks of Anaheim.

Playing career
St. Jacques was drafted 253rd overall in the ninth round of the 1998 NHL Entry Draft by the Philadelphia Flyers. A junior from Baie-Comeau Drakkar of the QMJHL, he made his professional debut at the tail end of the 1999–2000 season with Flyers affiliate, the Philadelphia Phantoms of the American Hockey League.

St. Jacques made his NHL debut in the 2000–01 season with the Flyers and spent the next two seasons primarily with the Phantoms before he was traded on February 7, 2003, along with Pavel Brendl to the Carolina Hurricanes for Sami Kapanen and Ryan Bast.

Prior to the 2005–06 season on October 3, St. Jacques was traded by the Hurricanes, to the Mighty Ducks of Anaheim for Craig Adams. In his lone appearance with the Ducks he scored the only goal in a 4–1 defeat to the Minnesota Wild on October 15, 2005. However, he essentially played with AHL affiliate, the Portland Pirates, for the season.

In the 2006–07 season, on December 28, 2006, St. Jacques was traded from the Ducks, along with P. A. Parenteau, to the Chicago Blackhawks in exchange for Sébastien Caron, Matt Keith and Chris Durno. He was then assigned to AHL affiliate, the Norfolk Admirals, for the duration of the year.

On October 4, 2007, St. Jacques signed with the Syracuse Crunch of the AHL for the 2007–08 season. After 13 games with the Crunch, he was loaned to back to the Ducks affiliate, the Portland Pirates on November 15.  On December 10, St. Jacques was signed by the Ducks but remained with the Pirates for the year.

On May 27, 2008, St. Jacques left North America and signed with German team, ERC Ingolstadt of the DEL. After three seasons with Ingolstadt, he signed with another DEL team, the Struabing Tigers, on a one-year contract on June 3, 2011.

Upon season end with the Tigers, St. Jacques announced his intention to retire and return to North America. However upon return to Canada, he signed a one-year contract with the semi-professional Jonquière Marquis of the LNAH on July 20, 2012.

Career statistics

References

External links
 

1980 births
Living people
Baie-Comeau Drakkar players
Canadian expatriate ice hockey players in Germany
Canadian ice hockey defencemen
Carolina Hurricanes players
ERC Ingolstadt players
Ice hockey people from Montreal
Lowell Lock Monsters players
Mighty Ducks of Anaheim players
Norfolk Admirals players
Philadelphia Flyers draft picks
Philadelphia Flyers players
Philadelphia Phantoms players
Portland Pirates players
Straubing Tigers players
Syracuse Crunch players